Kim Yun-gi (born 1922, date of death unknown) was a South Korean sports shooter. He competed in the 50 metre pistol event at the 1956 Summer Olympics.

References

External links
 

1922 births
Year of death missing
South Korean male sport shooters
Olympic shooters of South Korea
Shooters at the 1956 Summer Olympics
Place of birth missing